The women's water polo tournament at the 2017 World Aquatics Championships, organised by the FINA, was held in Budapest, Hungary from 16 to 28 July 2017.

The United States captured their fifth title by defeating Spain 13–6 in the final match. Bronze was secured by Russia who beat Canada 11–9.

Participating teams
Africa

Americas

Asia

Europe

Oceania

Qualification
 Hungary qualified as host.
 United States and Spain qualified at the 2016 World League.
 Italy, Russia, Australia and China qualified at the 2016 Olympic tournament.
 France, Greece and the Netherlands qualified at the 2016 European Championship.
 Brazil and Canada qualified at the Pan American Games.
 Japan and Kazakhstan qualified at the Asian tournament.
 South Africa qualified at the African tournament.
 New Zealand qualified at the Oceanian tournament.

Preliminary round

Group A
All times are CEST (UTC+2).

Group B
All times are CEST (UTC+2).

Group C
All times are CEST (UTC+2).

Group D
All times are CEST (UTC+2).

Knockout stage
Championship bracket

5th place bracket

9th place bracket

13th place bracket

Playoffs
All times are CEST (UTC+2).

Quarterfinals
All times are CEST (UTC+2).

13th–16th place classification
All times are CEST (UTC+2).

9th–12th place classification
All times are CEST (UTC+2).

5th–8th place classification
All times are CEST (UTC+2).

Semifinals
All times are CEST (UTC+2).

15th place match
All times are CEST (UTC+2).

13th place match
All times are CEST (UTC+2).

11th place match
All times are CEST (UTC+2).

9th place match
All times are CEST (UTC+2).

7th place match
All times are CEST (UTC+2).

5th place match
All times are CEST (UTC+2).

Bronze medal match
All times are CEST (UTC+2).

Gold medal match
All times are CEST (UTC+2).

Ranking and statistics

Final ranking

Team Roster
Gabby Stone, Maddie Musselman, Melissa Seidemann, Rachel Fattal, Paige Hauschild, Maggie Steffens (C), Jordan Raney, Kiley Neushul, Aria Fischer, Jamie Neushul, Makenzie Fischer, Alys Williams, Amanda Longan. Head coach: Adam Krikorian.

Top goalscorers

Source: SportResult

Awards

Most Valuable Player
 Maddie Musselman

Best Goalscorer
 Roberta Bianconi – 20 goals

Media All-Star Team
 Laura Ester – Goalkeeper
 Paula Leitón – Centre forward
 Roberta Bianconi
 Monika Eggens
 Rachel Fattal
 Rita Keszthelyi
 Maddie Musselman

References

External links
Official website
Records and statistics (reports by Omega)

2017
Women
2017 in women's water polo